Carrie Russell (born 18 October 1990) is a Jamaican track and field sprinter and bobsledder. She competed in the 4x100 metres relay event at the 2013 World Championships in Athletics, winning a gold medal. She is from the parish of St. Thomas. She attended the St. Thomas Technical High School. She was also the bronze medallist at the 2006 World Junior Championships in Athletics.

In addition to her athletics career, Russell has competed as a bobsleigh brakeman for Jamaica since the 2016–17 season. In January 2018 she was part of the Jamaican bobsleigh crew that secured qualification for the 2018 Winter Olympics in Pyongchang, South Korea, the first time that a Jamaican women's team competed at the Winter Olympics.

References

1990 births
Living people
People from Saint Thomas Parish, Jamaica
Jamaican female sprinters
Universiade medalists in athletics (track and field)
Jamaican female bobsledders
Bobsledders at the 2018 Winter Olympics
Olympic bobsledders of Jamaica
Universiade gold medalists for Jamaica
World Athletics Championships winners
Medalists at the 2011 Summer Universiade
21st-century Jamaican women